Andrew Vance (1815-1862) was an Irish barrister and Law Officer, whose promising career was cut short by his early death.

He was born in Dublin, third son of Andrew Vance of Rutland Square and Mary Falls, daughter of James Falls of Aughnacloy, County Tyrone. The Vance family is thought to have emigrated from Scotland to Ulster. Of his seven siblings, the best known is John Vance (1808-1875), MP for Dublin City, who coined the phrase "Home Rule will be Rome Rule" (i.e. Irish Home Rule equals the rule of the Catholic Church).

Andrew was called to the Bar, built up a flourishing practice, and in 1859 served as Law Adviser to the Lord Lieutenant of Ireland, a deputy to the Attorney General of Ireland and the Solicitor General for Ireland. In middle age he suffered from serious ill health, and he died after a long illness at Nice in November 1862. The newspapers paid tribute to a brilliant lawyer who had died in the prime of life. He was survived by his daughters, Frances and Mary.

He had some reputation as a legal writer, publishing articles in legal periodicals. Shortly before his death, he published "The Green Book", a casebook and commentary on the leading Irish statutes.

Sources
Irish Law Times November 1862
Irish Jurist Vol. 8 (1859)
O'Hart, John Irish Pedigrees 5th Edition Dublin 1892

References

Irish barristers
People from Dublin (city)
1862 deaths
1815 births